Zoran Gopčević  (Serbian Cyrillic: Зоран Гопчевић; 29 January 1955 – 30 September 2000) was a water polo player. As a member of Yugoslavia's water polo team he won a silver medal at the 1980 Summer Olympics.

See also
 List of Olympic medalists in water polo (men)

References

 Vaterpolo Klub Primorac Kotor: http://primorac.me/klub/legende.html

External links
 

1952 births
2000 deaths
Yugoslav male water polo players
Olympic medalists in water polo
Olympic silver medalists for Yugoslavia
Olympic water polo players of Yugoslavia
Water polo players at the 1980 Summer Olympics
Medalists at the 1980 Summer Olympics